TransGlobe Publishing is a London-based publisher that specialises in art and lifestyle photobooks. It was founded in 2003 by Director Hossein Amirsadeghi, who acts as publisher and author.

Publications
TransGlobe's publications fall into three main categories, the majority of which are co-published with Thames & Hudson:

Lifestyle publications which include original photography and interviews on a variety of characters that embody a particular city or genre.
Contemporary art publications which include overviews of specific regions or countries in the art world.
Artist studio publications which include original photography and interviews with foremost artists.

The photobooks focussed on artist's studio are particularly noteworthy due to the inclusion of rare interviews conducted with artists and art world personalities, such as Frank Auerbach, Maggi Hambling, Gavin Turk and Gustav Metzger (see: Sanctuary: Britain's Artists and their Studios (2012)), and Jeff Koons, John Baldessari, and Shirin Neshat (see: Art Studio America: Contemporary Artist’s Spaces (2013)).

TransGlobe's recent hardback, Voices: East London (2017), features a mix of portraits and interviews with East London creatives, such as actor Jonny Woo and gallerists Maureen Paley and Victoria Miro, profiled by artist Maryam Eisler.

These volumes include essays written by many notable art critics and historians, including Iwona Blazwick, Director of Whitechapel Gallery, former Turner Prize judge Richard Cork, and journalist Tom Morton.

Arts & Patronage Summit
In 2012 TransGlobe Publishing hosted the first Art & Patronage Summit, which began as an event focused on the visual arts and creativity in the greater Middle East, including North Africa, Iran, and Turkey.

The Summit consisted of panel discussions held at the British Museum and the Royal College of Art, a screening of Pia Getty's film 'Axis of Light' at the Institute of Contemporary Arts, and a charity auction held at Sothebys. Notable speakers included Chris Dercon, Director of Tate Modern, and Martin Roth, Director of the Victoria and Albert Museum.

Notable publications
Amirsadeghi, Hossein. Contemporary Art Colombia (2017). London: Thames & Hudson; TransGlobe Publishing. 
Eisler, Maryam. Voices: East London (2017). London: Thames & Hudson; TransGlobe Publishing. 
Amirsadeghi, Hossein and Eisler, Maryam. London Burning: Portraits from a Creative City (2015).  London: Thames & Hudson; TransGlobe Publishing. 
Amirsadeghi, Hossein and Petitgas, Catherine. Contemporary Art Mexico (2014). London: Thames & Hudson; TransGlobe Publishing. 
Amirsadeghi, Hossein and Eisler, Maryam. Art Studio America: Contemporary Artist’s Spaces (2013). London: Thames & Hudson; TransGlobe Publishing. 
Amirsadeghi, Hossein and Eisler, Maryam. Sanctuary: Britain's Artists and their Studios (2012).  London: Thames & Hudson; TransGlobe Publishing. 
Amirsadeghi, Hossein et al. New Vision: Arab Contemporary Art in the 21st Century (2011). London: Thames & Hudson; TransGlobe Publishing.
Amirsadeghi, Hossein. Art & Patronage: The Middle East (2010).  London: Thames & Hudson; TransGlobe Publishing. 
Amirsadeghi, Hossein. Unleashed: Contemporary Art from Turkey (2010). London: Thames & Hudson; TransGlobe Publishing.

References

External links

2003 establishments in England
Book publishing companies based in London
Visual arts publishing companies